Mario Díaz Pérez (born March 12, 1960, in Teocaltiche, Jalisco) is a Mexican football manager and former player.

External links
Liga MX 

1960 births
Living people
People from Teocaltiche
Footballers from Jalisco
Mexican football managers
Association football midfielders
Mexican footballers